Urzaybash (Urźaybaş) is a rural locality (a selo) in Arslanovsky Selsoviet, Buzdyaksky District, Bashkortostan, Russia. The population was 713 as of 2010. There are 4 streets.

Geography 
Urzaybash is located 26 km northwest of Buzdyak (the district's administrative centre) by road. Kyzyl-Yelga is the nearest rural locality.

References 

Rural localities in Buzdyaksky District